Delroy Edwards (1959 – 12 November 2005) was a Jamaican refugee who, after being refused political asylum in the United Kingdom, was killed by Yardie gang members within several days following his return. His refusal for asylum and later deportation from the country has since been publicly criticised and has called into question some of the immigration policies by the Home Office and the Immigration Adjudicator.

A longtime resident of Kingston, Edwards was frequently harassed during the 1990s after refusing to participate in criminal activities of a Yardie street gang affiliated with the People's National Party (PNP) resulting in suffering several attempts on his life, specifically an arson attack which killed two of his daughters as well as suffering serious gunshot wounds in 1995 and 1998. In 2001, he decided to flee to Great Britain formerly requesting political asylum. While residing in London, he became engaged to Jane Lowe and had a daughter, Taneika, with her before his deportation. Although Lowe attempted to provide an adequate legal representation for Edwards, his frequent transfer between three immigration centres as well as delayed responses from immigration officials made a solicitors attempt to appeal his deportation difficult. 

Despite his claims of persecution (including an incident in which he been warned by an unidentified individual that he would be killed if he returned to Jamaica) as well as demonstrating his previous wounds he had received in his shoulders and hands, he was declared an economic migrant by the Home Office and put on a flight to Jamaica after being held for eight days at Campsfield House in Oxfordshire, Harmondsworth Immigration Removal Centre near Heathrow and Haslar Immigration Removal Centre near Gosport. He reportedly went into hiding upon his arrival in Kingston, but was killed on the doorstep of an East Kingston house he had been staying at only nine days after his return.

External links
BBC News: Man killed days after deportation
Dad killed days after being deported by Simon Hardy
A culture of disbelief by Lester Holloway

1959 births
2005 deaths
Jamaican murder victims
People murdered in Jamaica
People deported from the United Kingdom